Gandhinagar Railway Station or Gandhinagar Capital (Station Code: GNC) is a major railway station with a 5-star hotel on its top in the city of Gandhinagar, Gujarat.

Location 

It serves the capital city of Gujarat. The station is located in Sector-14 of Gandhinagar. It was constructed by Indian Railway Stations Development Corporation, a Public Sector Enterprise(PSE) formed by JV between IRCON and RITES.

Major trains

Following trains halt at Gandhinagar Capital railway station in both direction:

 Bandra Terminus - Delhi Sarai Rohilla Garib Rath Express
 Ahmedabad - Haridwar Yoga Express
 Gandhinagar Capital - Indore Shanti Express
 Anand - Gandhinagar Capital MEMU 
 Gandhinagar Capital – Varetha MEMU
 Ahmedabad - Gandhinagar Capital MEMU
 Gandhinagar Capital - Bhavnagar Terminus Intercity Express
 Gandhinagar Capital – Varanasi Weekly Superfast Express
 Mumbai Central - Gandhinagar Shatabdi Express
 Gandhinagar - Mumbai Central Shatabdi Express
 Gandhinagar Capital - Mumbai Central Vande Bharat Express

Infrastructure 

The station consists of three platforms.After redevelopment of the station was completed it was inaugurated by Prime Minister Narendra Modi on 16 July 2021. The redeveloped station has been designed to be disabled-friendly and a five-star hotel has been built atop the platform. The luxury hotel is said to have 318 rooms and will be operated by a private entity. The hotel has been built to host national and international guests with the entire building been constructed keeping in tune with green building features.

References

External links 
 
 
 Gandhinagar Urban Development Authority 

Railway stations in Gandhinagar district
Ahmedabad railway division
Transport in Gandhinagar